The 1944–45 Cypriot Cup was the eighth edition of the Cypriot Cup. A total of 6 clubs entered the competition. It began on 18 February 1945 with the quarterfinals and concluded on 15 April 1945 with the final which was held at GSP Stadium. EPA won their 1st Cypriot Cup trophy after beating APOEL 3–1 in the final.

Format 
In the 1944–45 Cypriot Cup, participated all the teams of the Cypriot First Division.

The competition consisted of three knock-out rounds. In all rounds each tie was played as a single leg and was held at the home ground of the one of the two teams, according to the draw results. Each tie winner was qualifying to the next round. If a match was drawn, extra time was following. If extra time was drawn, there was a replay match.

Quarter-finals

Semi-finals 

1Abandoned at 2 - 0, Pezoporikos walked off.

Final

Sources

Bibliography

See also 
 Cypriot Cup
 1944–45 Cypriot First Division

Cypriot Cup seasons
1944–45 domestic association football cups
1944–45 in Cypriot football